Dmitry Tishkin (born 5 February 1980) is a Russian cross-country skier. He competed in the men's sprint event at the 2002 Winter Olympics.

References

1980 births
Living people
Russian male cross-country skiers
Olympic cross-country skiers of Russia
Cross-country skiers at the 2002 Winter Olympics
Sportspeople from Krasnoyarsk Krai